is a village located in Fukushima Prefecture, Japan. , the village had an estimated population of 3,081 in 1107 households, and a population density of 23 persons per km2.

Geography
Samegawa is located in the southernmost portion of Fukushima prefecture, bordering on Ibaraki Prefecture to the southeast. The area of the village is hilly with an altitude of between 400 and 600 meters, and over fifty percent covered in forest. Samegawa has a humid climate (Köppen climate classification Cfa).

Neighboring municipalities
 Fukushima Prefecture
Iwaki
 Hanawa
 Tanagura
 Ishikawa
 Asakawa
Furudono
Ibaraki Prefecture
 Kitaibaraki

Demographics
Per Japanese census data, the population of Samegawa peaked around the year 1950 and has been in decline over the past 70 years.

Climate
Samegawa has a humid climate (Köppen climate classification Cfa).

History
The area of present-day Samegawa was part of ancient Mutsu Province. After the Meiji Restoration, it was organized as part of Higashishirakawa in the Nakadōri region of Iwaki Province. Samegawa village was formed on April 1, 1889 with the creation of the modern municipalities system.

Education
Samegawa has two public elementary schools and one public junior high school operated by the village government, and one public high school operated by the Fukushima Prefectural Board of Education.

Fukushima Prefectural Shumei Commercial High School
Samegawa Junior High School

Transportation

Railway
 Samegawa does not have any passenger railway service.

Highway

References

External links

 

 
Villages in Fukushima Prefecture